The Slatina is a left tributary of the river Timiș in Romania. It flows into the Timiș in Slatina-Timiș.

References

Rivers of Romania
Rivers of Caraș-Severin County